Tabernaemontana cerea is a species of plant in the family Apocynaceae. It is found in Venezuela, Guyana, and Suriname.

References

cerea